Seguenzia occidentalis is a species of extremely small deep water sea snail, a marine gastropod mollusk in the family Seguenziidae.

Distribution
The type species was found in the Pacific Ocean off Acapulco, Mexico at a depth of 1,200 m.

References

 Dall (1908) Bull. Mus. Comp. Zool. 43(6): 216,325

External links
 To Encyclopedia of Life
 To USNM Invertebrate Zoology Mollusca Collection
 To World Register of Marine Species
 Smithsonian Institution: Seguenzia occidentalis

occidentalis
Gastropods described in 1908